Ntabankulu Local Municipality is a local municipality in Alfred Nzo District Municipality in the Wild Coast Region of the Eastern Cape Province in South Africa.

Ntabankulu is an isiXhosa name meaning "great or big mountain", since the municipal area is mountainous in character.

It was formerly part of the OR Tambo District Municipality, but was transferred to the Alfred Nzo District Municipality after the 2011 municipal election.

Main places
The 2011 census for the Ntabankulu Municipality states a population of 123,976 with these most populated main places

Politics 

The municipal council consists of thirty-eight members elected by mixed-member proportional representation. Nineteen councillors are elected by first-past-the-post voting in nineteen wards, while the remaining nineteen are chosen from party lists so that the total number of party representatives is proportional to the number of votes received. In the election of 1 November 2021 the African National Congress (ANC) won a majority of thirty-one seats on the council.
The following table shows the results of the election.

References

External links
 http://www.ntabankulu.gov.za/

Local municipalities of the OR Tambo District Municipality